MNG Enterprises, Inc., doing business as Digital First Media and MediaNews Group, is a Denver, Colorado-based newspaper publisher owned by Alden Global Capital. The company has been growing its portfolio and as of May 2021, owns over 100 newspapers and 200 assorted other publications.

With its acquisition of Tribune Publishing in late May 2021, Digital First Media became the second-largest owner of newspapers in the United States, as calculated by total number of subscribers. It is second to Gannett.

History

MediaNews Group was founded by Richard Scudder and William Dean Singleton. Both had experience in the American newspaper industry. Scudder ran the Newark (New Jersey) News, a newspaper founded by his grandfather. Singleton had begun his career as a reporter when he was 15, for a small-town Texas newspaper and subsequently became the president of Albritton Communications, a newspaper conglomerate in Texas.

Based in Denver, Colorado, Scudder and Singleton purchased their first newspaper in 1983. They incorporated MediaNews Group in 1985, with Singleton as CEO and Scudder as chairman. The company began to purchase small local newspapers that were undergoing financial troubles. In 1987, the company made its first major acquisition: the Denver Post. Ultimately, it became one of the largest newspaper companies in the United States. It operated 56 daily newspapers in 12 states, with combined daily and Sunday circulation of about 2.4 million and 2.7 million, respectively. The company owned KTVA, a CBS affiliate in Anchorage, Alaska, from March 2000 to October 2012, and radio stations in Texas.

Singleton was a pioneer in "clustering": cutting jobs at individual newspapers and consolidating functions at a hub near a cluster of newspapers.  For example, the Alameda Newspaper Group in suburban San Francisco in the mid-1990s had a central newsroom in Pleasanton, California, that did all the copy editing, layout and page makeup for five daily papers. Upon acquiring the diverse group of papers, Singleton consolidated several news sections (such as sports and features) to one local office away from the metropolitan area, having a few reporters do the job of many people.

Singleton soon earned the nickname "Lean Dean" for his slashing of jobs through clustering. His tight-fisted methods were later adopted as the preferred model by Alden Global Capital and other hedge funds that took over near-bankrupt newspaper companies.

In August 2006, Singleton took out around $350 million in loans to purchase four newspapers from McClatchy Company. Among those providing the loan was the Bill and Melinda Gates Foundation. It came out of bankruptcy in March 2010 under the majority ownership of its lenders. The MediaNews creditors then removed Media News president Jody Lodovic and its chairman, William Dean Singleton, was reassigned to the position of "executive chairman of the board." The Singleton-Lodovic appointees to the MediaNews board were replaced by new directors representing the stockholders group led by Alden Global Capital, a hedge fund firm which has acquired a large, though not controlling, stake. Several interim executive positions were also filled by people related to Alden or its parent, Smith Management LLC. MediaNews became managed by Journal Register's Digital First Media.

As of 2012, the combined newspapers and online media outlets managed by the company had 66.6 million readers. In 2017, the company was ranked third-largest among the newspaper groups in the country. Alden Global Capital has been accused of "strip mining" its newspaper holdings. In October 2017, the company's CEO, Steve Rossi, stepped down from his position. In February 2018, Digital First Media put in a $11.9 million winning bid to purchase the Boston Herald.

In March 2016, a bankruptcy judge approved the sale of Freedom Communications and its two major newspapers, the Orange County Register and the Riverside Press-Enterprise to Digital First Media. The papers were integrated into Digital First Media's Los Angeles Newspaper Group, which was renamed the Southern California News Group on the same day.

In November 2018, DFM announced plans to lay off 107 staff from its Colorado Springs, Colorado financial services operations, as it outsources the work to Genpact starting December 28.

In January 2019, Digital First Media acquired 7.5% of Gannett's public stock, and made an unsolicited bid to acquire Gannett for $1.36 billion. On February 4, 2019 Gannett's board "unanimously rejected" the offer, saying "that MNG does not have a realistic plan to acquire Gannett". On February 11, 2019, Gannett issued a press release accusing Digital First Media of engaging in a proxy fight. After a failed attempt to place 3 nominees on Gannett's board of directors through a proxy vote on May 16, 2019, DFM reduced their stake to 4.2%. In August 2019, GateHouse Media ultimately announced its intent to acquire Gannett instead.

On Feb. 5, 2020, MediaNews Group purchased the assets of Minnesota-based Red Wing Publishing/Big Fish Works. The sale included the Hutchinson Leader, the Litchfield Independent Review, the International Falls Journal, the Lakeshore Weekly News, the Chanhassen Villager, Chaska Herald, Eden Prairie News, Jordan Independent, Shakopee Valley News, Prior Lake American and the Savage Pacer.

In April 2020, two of Minneapolis' west metro newspapers—The Eden Prairie News and Lakeshore Weekly News bought earlier in 2020 by Digital First Media—announced their closure at the end of April 2020 due to a decline in advertising revenue during the coronavirus outbreak.

Newspapers

Daily newspapers 
Listed alphabetically by name, daily newspapers owned by MediaNews include the following:

Weekly newspapers 
Some of the weeklies owned by the company:
 Colorado Hometown Weekly, serving east Boulder County, Colorado communities of Erie, Lafayette, Louisville, Superior
 Gazette Newspapers, two weekly newspapers in Long Beach, California
 Excélsior, three Spanish-language newspapers in Southern California
Lamar Ledger of Lamar, Colorado
 Nashoba Publishing, several weekly newspapers in northern Massachusetts

Former newspapers 
Fairbanks Daily News-Miner of Fairbanks, Alaska
Kodiak Daily Mirror of Kodiak, Alaska
Salt Lake Tribune of Salt Lake City, Utah

Other properties 
Other MediaNews properties include:

 LA.com, a portal site based in Los Angeles, California
 U-Entertainment of Los Angeles, California
 Woman Magazine of Norwalk, Connecticut

Former properties 

 Charleston Daily Mail, a former newspaper in Charleston, West Virginia
 KTVA television (CBS Affiliate) in Anchorage, Alaska (March 2000-December 2012) Now owned by General Communication.
 Lake Country Radio stations (now owned by High Plains Radio Network, LLC):
 KLXK -- Breckenridge, Texas
 KROO -- Breckenridge, Texas
 KSWA -- Graham, Texas
 KWKQ -- Graham, Texas

Business approach

Cost-cutting 

MediaNews Group is known as a cost-cutter in the newspaper publishing industry. The company has a reputation for buying smaller daily newspapers in a single area (examples include Los Angeles and the San Francisco Bay Area) and consolidating their operations, including sharing staff writers and printing facilities. Some former employees say that the newspapers are focused on making a profit to the detriment of good journalism.

William Dean Singleton was quick to point out MediaNews' commitment to print journalism but resisted efforts to develop online web sites for his newspapers, believing print would remain the format favored by readers.  The Berkshire Eagle editor David E. Scribner, two years after MediaNews bought his newspaper, said the staff realized Singleton had miscalculated the impact of the internet and attributed the downward spiral of his media properties to his short-sightedness.

In recent years similar criticism has been aimed at the new organizational structure under Digital First Media. The Denver Post editorial staff and others have criticized the owners of hedge fund group, Alden Global Capital. Alden has a reputation for cutting costs by reducing the number of journalists working on its newspapers as Singleton had done and March 2018, The Washington Post called Alden "one of the most ruthless of the corporate strip-miners seemingly intent on destroying local journalism." Alden has additionally received critical coverage from its editorial staff of the Denver Post and described Alden Global Capital as "vulture capitalists" after multiple staff layoffs.

Pension funds 

The company has been criticized for investing its employee pensions in funds managed by its parent company, Alden Global Capital.

References

External links 
 
 

 
Mass media companies of the United States
Newspaper companies of the United States
Companies based in Denver
Mass media companies established in 1985
Publishing companies established in 1985
1985 establishments in Colorado